Stepnoy is a rural locality (a khutor) in Krasnyaynskoye Rural Settlement, Uryupinsky District, Volgograd Oblast, Russia. The population was 11 as of 2010.

Geography 
Stepnoy is located in steppe, 16 km northeast of Uryupinsk (the district's administrative centre) by road. Serkovsky is the nearest rural locality.

References 

Rural localities in Uryupinsky District